Centromerus is a genus of  dwarf spiders that was first described by David B. Hirst in 1886.

Species
 it contains eighty-eight species and two subspecies:
C. abditus Gnelitsa, 2007 – Ukraine, Russia (Europe)
C. acutidentatus Deltshev, 2002 – Balkans
C. albidus Simon, 1929 – Europe, Turkey
C. amurensis Eskov & Marusik, 1992 – Russia (South Siberia to Far East)
C. andrei Dresco, 1952 – Spain
C. andriescui Weiss, 1987 – Romania
C. anoculus Wunderlich, 1995 – Madeira
C. arcanus (O. Pickard-Cambridge, 1873) – Greenland, Europe, Russia (Europe to Middle Siberia)
C. balazuci Dresco, 1952 – France
C. bonaeviae Brignoli, 1979 – Italy (Sardinia)
C. brevipalpus (Menge, 1866) (type) – Europe, Kazakhstan
C. bulgarianus (Drensky, 1931) – Bulgaria
C. capucinus (Simon, 1884) – Europe, Caucasus
C. cavernarum (L. Koch, 1872) – Europe
C. chappuisi Fage, 1931 – Romania
C. cinctus (Simon, 1884) – France (Corsica), Algeria, Tunisia
C. clarus (L. Koch, 1879) – Russia (Europe to Far East)
C. cornupalpis (O. Pickard-Cambridge, 1875) – USA, Canada
C. corsicus (Simon, 1910) – France (Corsica)
C. cottarellii Brignoli, 1979 – Italy
C. dacicus Dumitrescu & Georgescu, 1980 – Romania, Serbia
C. denticulatus (Emerton, 1909) – USA
C. desmeti Bosmans, 1986 – Morocco, Algeria, Spain (Majorca)
C. dilutus (O. Pickard-Cambridge, 1875) – Europe
C. europaeus (Simon, 1911) – Portugal, Spain, France, Algeria, Balkans
C. fuerteventurensis Wunderlich, 1992 – Canary Is.
C. furcatus (Emerton, 1882) – USA, Canada
C. gatoi Ballarin & Pantini, 2020 – Italy
C. gentilis Dumitrescu & Georgescu, 1980 – Romania
C. hanseni Ballarin & Pantini, 2020 – Italy
C. ictericus (Simon, 1929) – France
C. incilium (L. Koch, 1881) – Europe, Russia (Europe to West Siberia)
C. isaiai Bosmans, 2015 – France (mainland, Corsica), Italy (Sardinia)
C. lakatnikensis (Drensky, 1931) – Hungary, Serbia, Macedonia, Bulgaria, Greece
C. latidens (Emerton, 1882) – USA, Canada
C. laziensis Hu, 2001 – China
C. leruthi Fage, 1933 – Europe
C. levitarsis (Simon, 1884) – Europe, Russia (Europe to South Siberia)
C. longibulbus (Emerton, 1882) – USA
C. marciai Bosmans & Gasparo, 2015 – Italy (Sardinia)
C. mariannae Slowik, 2018 – Canada, USA
C. milleri Deltshev, 1974 – Bulgaria
C. minor Tanasevitch, 1990 – Turkey, Caucasus (Russia, Georgia, Armenia, Azerbaijan)
C. minutissimus Merrett & Powell, 1993 – Britain, Germany
C. nurgush Tanasevitch & Esyunin, 2013 – Russia (Europe)
C. obenbergeri Kratochvíl & Miller, 1938 – Montenegro
C. obscurus Bösenberg, 1902 – Central Europe
C. pabulator (O. Pickard-Cambridge, 1875) – Europe
C. pacificus Eskov & Marusik, 1992 – Russia (South Siberia to Far East)
C. paradoxus (Simon, 1884) – Western Mediterranean
C. pasquinii Brignoli, 1971 – Italy
C. persimilis (O. Pickard-Cambridge, 1912) – Europe
C. persolutus (O. Pickard-Cambridge, 1875) – USA, Canada
C. petrovi Dimitrov & Deltshev, 2019 – Turkey
C. phoceorum Simon, 1929 – Portugal, Spain, France, Madeira, Algeria, Tunisia
C. piccolo Weiss, 1996 – Germany
C. ponsi Lissner, 2016 – Spain (Balearic Is.)
C. pratensis Gnelitsa & Ponomarev, 2010 – Russia (Europe)
C. prudens (O. Pickard-Cambridge, 1873) – Europe, North Africa
Centromerus p. electus (Simon, 1884) – France
C. puddui Brignoli, 1979 – Italy (Sardinia)
C. qinghaiensis Hu, 2001 – China
C. qingzangensis Hu, 2001 – China
C. remotus Roewer, 1938 – Indonesia (Moluccas)
C. satyrus (Simon, 1884) – France
C. sellarius (Simon, 1884) – Europe, Russia (Europe to South Siberia)
C. semiater (L. Koch, 1879) – Europe, Russia (Europe to Middle Siberia)
C. serbicus Deltshev, 2002 – Serbia
C. serratus (O. Pickard-Cambridge, 1875) – Europe
C. setosus Miller & Kratochvíl, 1940 – Slovakia
C. sexoculatus Wunderlich, 1992 – Madeira
C. silvicola (Kulczyński, 1887) – Central Europe to Balkans and Ukraine
C. sinuatus Bosmans, 1986 – Morocco, Algeria, Tunisia
C. sinus (Simon, 1884) – Spain, France
C. subalpinus Lessert, 1907 – Alps (France, Switzerland, Italy, Germany, Austria, Slovenia)
C. subcaecus Kulczyński, 1914 – Europe
C. succinus (Simon, 1884) – Western Mediterranean
C. sylvaticus (Blackwall, 1841) – North America, Europe, Turkey, Russia (Europe to Far East), China, Korea, Japan
Centromerus s. paucidentatus Deltshev, 1983 – Bulgaria
C. tennapex (Barrows, 1940) – USA
C. terrigenus Yaginuma, 1972 – Russia (Sakhalin, Kurile Is.), Japan
C. timidus (Simon, 1884) – Spain, Romania
C. tongiorgii Ballarin & Pantini, 2020 – Italy
C. tridentinus Caporiacco, 1952 – Italy
C. trilobus Tao, Li & Zhu, 1995 – China
C. truki Millidge, 1991 – Caroline Is.
C. unicolor Roewer, 1959 – Turkey
C. ussuricus Eskov & Marusik, 1992 – Russia (Far East)
C. valkanovi Deltshev, 1983 – Bulgaria, Greece, Turkey
C. variegatus Denis, 1962 – Madeira

See also
 List of Linyphiidae species

References

Araneomorphae genera
Cosmopolitan spiders
Linyphiidae
Taxa named by Friedrich Dahl